There were many reactions to Operation Pillar of Defense:

Domestic

Supranational bodies

Countries

Non-governmental organizations

 Amnesty International said that both sides should stop the violence, and Ann Harrison, Deputy Director of Amnesty International's Middle East and North Africa Programme, said "The Israeli military must not carry out further indiscriminate attacks, or attacks in densely populated residential areas that will inevitably harm civilians." and "Palestinian armed groups in Gaza meanwhile must not fire indiscriminate rockets into Israel. The international community must put pressure on both sides to fully respect the laws of war and protect civilian lives and property."
 The Palestinian Centre for Human Rights called for intervention on the part of the international community to restore the rule of law. Remarking that all States are bound by a legal obligation to 'ensure respect' for international humanitarian law in all circumstances, it states that the international community's failure to hold Israel accountable for its behavior in the occupied Palestinian territory "has resulted in pervasive impunity."
 Human Rights Watch said that "Israeli and Palestinian forces alike need to make all feasible efforts to avoid harming civilians,” and "there is no justification for Palestinian armed groups unlawfully launching rockets at Israeli population centers.” It accused Israel of using disproportionate force in its attacks and of firing at rescuers of victims of Israeli shelling. In the wake of the ceasefire deal, HRW called on both sides to review policies that harm civilians, including Israel's "blanket ban on travel to the West Bank, and firing live ammunition to restrict Palestinians’ access to up to 35 percent of Gaza's farmland and 80 percent of its fishing waters." It has accused Israel of failing to provide information to justify the strike on the al-Dalu family home, which the group has condemned as unlawful, disproportionate and a war crime.
 The American Center for Law & Justice sent a legal brief to the U.N. Security Council, warning that there is no legal or moral defense for Hamas's "indiscriminate rocket attacks", "use of civilian buildings", and the "use of human shields." The organization added that Israel goes beyond the requirements of the law to protect innocent life and that under the laws of war "civilian deaths are the legal and moral responsibility of the terrorists."
 The Israeli human rights organization B'Tselem warned both sides about causing civilian deaths and stated that according to international humanitarian law, civilians must never be targeted and all measures must be taken to protect them. B'Tselem added that Hamas combatants, as well as other armed groups operating against Israel, fire at Israeli civilian targets from within Palestinian civilian areas and do not distinguish themselves from the civilian populations, actions which B'Tselem consider a war crime and "severe violation of International Humanitarian Law". B'Tselem pointed out that Israeli officials are using the conduct of militants to justify harm to Palestinian civilians and stated that the fact that Hamas combatants and other organizations commit war crimes does not automatically justify Israeli actions that harm civilians, and called upon Israel to follow its legal and moral duty to minimize as much as possible harm to civilians, despite Hamas' illegal conduct.

Protests

Countries in which rallies and protests in support of the Palestinians took place included Malaysia, Indonesia, India, Pakistan, Turkey, Egypt, Yemen, Italy, United States, United Kingdom, Canada, Australia, New Zealand, Poland, South Africa, Germany, Belgium, Israel, Argentine, Chile, Venezuela, South Korea, Hong Kong, Norway and Japan. Countries in which rallies and protests in support of Israel included: the United States, the United Kingdom, South Africa, Australia, France, Argentina, Brazil, Canada, Chile, Guatemala, El Salvador, Finland, France, Germany, Israel, Netherlands, Norway, Poland, Spain and Sweden.

References

Gaza–Israel conflict
2012 in the Gaza Strip
Reactions to 2010s events